Chapples Park is located in the centre of Fort William, Ontario, which today forms the south end of Thunder Bay. It forms a key part of Thunder Bay's recreation trail system.

The park's main feature is an 18-hole, par 71 golf course operated by the city. The course includes a practice range. In the centre of the park is a recreation area featuring tennis courts, a soccer field, and baseball diamonds.

The Thunder Bay Botanical Conservatory is located on the eastern edge of the park, accessible via Dease Street. The conservatory displays plants from around the world in a tropical setting. The facility was first opened in 1967 as a centennial project.

See also

Thunder Bay Soroptimist International Friendship Garden
Fort William Stadium
Chapples Park Stadium

References

Parks in Thunder Bay